Makedonija Zasekogaš (in Macedonian Cyrillic: Македонија Засекогаш, English translation: Macedonia Forever) often credited as Makedonija Zasekogash, is a project made by the Agency for youth and sport of Macedonia realized with an album. The album consists of 14 traditional Macedonian songs with new arrangement sung by the Macedonian music stars.

Production history
The agency for youth and sport of Macedonia started the project under the motto of: "Да ги оживееме Македонските изворни песни" (English translation: "Let us revive the authentic Macedonian folk songs"). The right to participate in the project was preserved to citizens of the Republic of Macedonia. The applied composition had to be a traditional Macedonian song, but with new arrangement. The best remakes were awarded by being included in the compilation. 14 traditional songs were sung with new arrangement by the most famous Macedonian singers. The whole project finished with a big concert on the square Macedonia in Skopje.

Track listing
"Vlado Janevski - Zemjo Makedonska"
elaboration: Ante Pecotić & Vlado Janevskiarrangement: Ante Pecotić & Vlado Janevskiproduction: Ante Pecotić & Vlado Janevski
"Kaliopi - Narode makedonski"
elaboration: Darko Dimitrov arrangement: Darko Dimitrovproduction: Darko Dimitrov
"Vlatko Stefanovski - Makedonsko devojče"
elaboration: Vlatko Stefanovski arrangement: Vlatko Stefanovskiproduction: Vlatko Stefanovski
"Boris Trajanov & Zoran DZorlev - Koga padna nad Pirina"
elaboration: Zoran DZorlev arrangement: Aleksandar Mitevskiproduction: Aleksandar Mitevski
"Karolina Gočeva, Garo & Tavitjan Brothers - Dafino vino crveno"
elaboration: Tavitjan Brothersarrangement: Tavitjan Brothersproduction:  Tavitjan Brothers
"Lambe Alabakovski - Jovano, Jovanke"
elaboration: Darko Dimitrovarrangement: Darko Dimitrovproduction: Darko Dimitrov
"Sintezis - Lele Jano"
elaboration: Sintezisarrangement: Sintezisproduction: Sintezis
"Aleksandar Mitevski - Poslušajte patrioti"
elaboration: Zoran DZorlevarrangement: Aleksandar Mitevskiproduction: Aleksandar Mitevski
"Sonja Tarčulovska - Sardisale Lešočkiot manastir"
elaboration: Valentino Skenderovskiarrangement: Valentino Skenderovskiproduction: Valentino Skenderovski
"Elena Risteska - More Sokol Pie"
elaboration: Darko Dimitrovarrangement: Darko Dimitrovproduction: Darko Dimitrov
"Sašo Gigov - Giš - I nie sme deca na Makedonija"
elaboration: Robert Sazdovarrangement: Robert Sazdovproduction: Robert Sazdov
"Tamara Todevska, DJ Babura and Al Frose - So maki sum se rodila"
elaboration: DJ Baburaarrangement: DJ Baburaproduction: Al Frose
"Dario - Slušam kaj šumat šumite"
elaboration: Aleksandar Mitevskiarrangement: Aleksandar Mitevskiproduction: Aleksandar Mitevski
"Aleksandra Pileva & Jovan Jovanov - Nazad, nazad Kalino mome"
elaboration: Jovan Jovanovarrangement: Jovan Jovanovproduction: Jovan Jovanov

References

Albums by Macedonian artists
2008 compilation albums